Events from the year 1789 in Canada.

Incumbents
Monarch: George III

Governors
Governor of the Canadas: Guy Carleton, 1st Baron Dorchester
Governor of New Brunswick: Thomas Carleton
Governor of Nova Scotia: John Parr
Commodore-Governor of Newfoundland: John Elliot
Governor of St. John's Island: Edmund Fanning

Events
 1789–93 – Alexander Mackenzie of Canada, seeking northern river route to the Pacific, travels to the Arctic Ocean; on second journey he crosses continent by land, making contact with many tribes.
 Alexander Mackenzie journeys to the Beaufort Sea, following what would later be named the Mackenzie River.
 David Thompson learns surveying from Philip Turnor.
 Lord Grenville proposes that lands in Upper Canada be held in free and common soccage, and that the tenure of Lower Canadian lands be optional with the inhabitants.

Births
November 13 – Denis-Benjamin Papineau, joint premier of the Province of Canada (died 1854)

Deaths

References

 
Canada
89